Sauromatum is a genus of flowering plants in the family Araceae. The genus is native to tropical Africa, tropical Asia, and the Arabian Peninsula. Their inflorescences last for only a few hours to a day and give off an unpleasant smell. The inflorescence disperses its odor by heating up.

Species
Sauromatum brevipes (Hook.f.) N.E.Br. - Tibet, Nepal, Bhutan, Assam
Sauromatum brevipilosum (Hett. & Sizemore) Cusimano & Hett. - Sumatra
Sauromatum diversifolium (Wall. ex Schott) Cusimano & Hett. - eastern Himalayas, Tibet, Sichuan, Yunnan, Nepal, Bhutan, Assam, Myanmar, Cambodia
Sauromatum gaoligongense J.C.Wang & H.Li - Yunnan
Sauromatum giganteum (Engl.) Cusimano & Hett. - Anhui, Gansu, Hebei, Henan, Jilin, Liaoning, Shandong, Shanxi, Sichuan, Tibet
Sauromatum hirsutum (S.Y.Hu) Cusimano & Hett. - Yunnan, Laos, Thailand, Vietnam
Sauromatum horsfieldii Miq. - Guangxi, Guizhou, Sichuan, Yunnan, Laos, Myanmar, Thailand, Vietnam, Sumatra, Java, Bali
Sauromatum tentaculatum (Hett.) Cusimano & Hett. - Thailand
Sauromatum venosum (Dryand. ex Aiton) Kunth - tropical Africa from Ethiopia south to Mozambique and west to Cameroon; Yemen, Saudi Arabia; Indian Subcontinent; Myanmar; Tibet, Yunnan

References

Aroideae
Araceae genera